Drysdale is an electoral division of the Legislative Assembly in Australia's Northern Territory. It was first created in 1997, and is named after Fred Drysdale, a former member of the Legislative Council. It is an urban electorate covering 5 km² in north-western Palmerston including the CBD and the suburbs of Driver, Gray, Yarrawonga and most of Moulden. There were 5,828 people enrolled within the electorate as of August 2020.

Palmerston had long been considered a conservative stronghold, and for the first eight years of its life, Drysdale was considered to be a safe seat for the Country Liberal Party.  CLP candidate Stephen Dunham easily won the seat at the 1997 election and easily retained it at the 2001 election.

Most commentators predicted that the CLP's dominance in Drysdale would continue at the 2005 election, although the Labor Party were running a high-profile candidate, former AFL Northern Territory general manager Chris Natt. However, there was a significant swing to the ALP across the territory on election day, and Dunham was ultimately defeated, along with several other CLP sitting members. The final result took several days to be decided, but ultimately Natt won the seat on a swing of 17.5 percent.  Even more surprisingly, he won enough primary votes to take the seat without the need for preferences.  However, before the 2008 election, a redistribution erased Natt's majority and made Drysdale a notional CLP seat. Ross Bohlin regained the seat for the CLP on a large swing, but lost his preselection in 2012 and contested the election as an independent candidate. He was defeated by the CLP's endorsed candidate, Lia Finocchiaro.

After a redistribution transferred much of Finocchiaro's base to the new seat of Spillett, Finocchiaro opted to transfer to Spillett even though Drysdale was still a safe CLP seat on paper.  However, at the 2016 election, the CLP's primary vote plunged by over 20 percent amid the party's near-total meltdown in Palmerston. Eva Lawler took the seat for Labor on a large swing, becoming only the second Labor member ever to win it. She then increased her majority at the 2020 election, becoming the first Labor MLA to retain a Palmerston seat.

Members for Drysdale

Election results

References

External links
 Division profile from the Northern Territory Electoral Commission

Drysdale